Bukovel is the largest ski resort in Eastern Europe situated in Ukraine, in Nadvirna Raion, Ivano-Frankivsk Oblast (province) of western Ukraine. A part of it is in state property. In 2012, Bukovel was named the fastest-growing ski resort in the world.

History
The resort was pioneered in 2000 by a joint venture of Scorzonera Ltd. and Horizont AL as an all-year-round tourist and recreational complex. The research for potential ski fields and cableways of the first stage was conducted in cooperation with Plan-Alp, Austria, and Ecosign, Canada, who also finalized the master plan for the resort.
By late 2001, a first 691-meter ski lift was launched at the Northern slope of Mountain Bukovel along with the projected chairlift ropeway at the Bukovel's north-western slope. The project was finished in Sept.-Oct. 2002 as a 1000-metre ropeway.
In 2003, a second slope, 2A ski run with a chairlift was introduced, and in 2004 a 7A ski run with a surface lift started its operation.

With mere 48,000 visitors in 2003, Bukovel welcomed 206,000 tourists in 2005-2006, 400,000 in 2006-2007 and 850,000 visitors in 2008-2009. The 2010-2011 winter season recorded 1,200,000 day visits with foreigners' amounting to 8-10% of all visitors. 
In 2012, the Bukovel was named the fastest-growing ski resort worldwide.

In December 2016, after the nationalization of PrivatBank, a part of the Bukovel resort became state-owned. In October 2018, the state-owned part of it was put up for sale. On 7 March 2020 it was announced that portion of the resort that belongs to Privatbank will be sold.

Infrastructure

There are 61 pistes sections of which 12 are Blue (beginners), 41 Red (intermediates) and 8 are Black (experts).

There are 11×4-person chair lifts, 1×3-person chair lift, 1×2-person chair lift and 1×T-bar. The top elevation is on Mount Dovha at 1,372 meters and the base elevation is 900 meters above sea level, for a total vertical drop of 472 meters.

There are five distinct mountains in the area:
Bukovel – 3,698 ft (1,127 m) 
Chorna Kleva – 4,088 ft (1,246 m)
Babyn Pohar – 3,870 ft (1,180 m) 
Dovha – 4,501 ft (1,372 m)
Bulchinokha – 3,770 ft (1,150 m) 
On the other side of mount Babyn Pohar is a nature preserve "Gorgany". Bukovel's ski season depends on climatic factors and is usually around the beginning of December to mid-April. Night skiing is available from 4:30 to 7:30 p.m. 
Bukovel is growing rapidly, and new equipment and runs are being added each year.

Recreation

The resort contains all facilities for sports, business, leisure and health
 60 km of the ski runs equipped with snow cannons
 67 ski runs of various difficulty levels
 17 skilifts capable of servicing 34,700 people an hour
 ski school that includes a school for children
 ski rental shops
 snow park
 bicycle park

Accommodations
7 high-profile hotels 
Capacity to host 1,500 people at the resort itself and 12,000 people in the vicinity
4- and 5-star chalets with a garage, swimming pool, sauna and a personal ski-in and ski-out

Entertainment
Buka Entertainment Centre
A lake with an eco-friendly heating and a beach
Rope alpine-park
A skating field
Bicycle park
Dog sleds riding
Horse riding
Quadracycling
Paintball/Airsoft
Extreme Sports Park
Walking tourist routes and tours
Rafting
Snowbiking
Kinder Club for children
Leopark Children's Entertainment Centre
Big-Airbag
Equipment rental (Zorb, Segway scooters, Quad cycles, Snowbikes, Snowtubing, Snowmobiles)

Health Facilities
Starting in 2008, the Bukovel has been developing as a health and balneotherapy centre for people with problems with musculoskeletal, digestive and urinary systems (as attested by the Odessa Institute for Baleotherapy and Resorts). Bukovel has a free-of-charge pump room to drink mineral water. The resort is also known for its baths of mineral water and herb extracts.

The Largest Artificial Lake in Ukraine
In the summer of 2014, Bukovel opened the largest artificial lake in Ukraine.

- area of 6,8 hectares

- dimensions of 750 x 140 m

- the beach stretching for 2 km

- the depth up to 15 m

The lake was the most ambitious resort project worth almost 150 mln UAH.

The lake shores have arranged deckchairs, recreation areas and beach cafes. And on the lake itself there is the whole range of water activities:
 water - skis
 wakeboarding
 kayaking
 business jet
 jet - ski
 waterslide
 diving school

For the safety of tourists, all sites have experienced instructors and accredited lifeguards present. The areas for swimming and water activities are delineated.

The lake water is clear and warm up to 20-22 degrees. Among tourists, the lake has been called the "Carpathian Sea".

Ski runs and lifts

Bukovel comprises facilities situated at five mountains: Dovha (1,372 m), Bukovel (1,127 m), Bulchinekha (1,455 m), Babiy Pohar (1,180 m), and Chorna Kleva (1,241 m) thus giving it 60 km of ski runs of various difficulty levels.

All runs provide space for up to 15,000 skiers to ski simultaneously. The runs are on slopes with grass basis, equipped with snow cannons and protected from direct sun light. Three of the runs are lighted to provide skiing at night.

During season, the resort has 16 ski lifts capable in operation to service 34,700 people an hour.

There are 63 ski runs in total, from 300 to 2,350 m long and are classified as blue, red and black. Their height drop is 40 to 285 m.

The resort also has a professional giant slalom run and a mogul run 1A.

Ski resort has 16 ski lifts, including:
1 six-seat chairlift (lift 3)
13 four-seat chairlifts (lifts 1R, 2R, 5, 7, 8, 11, 12, 13, 14, 15, 16, 17, 22)
1 three-seat chairlift (lift 9)
1 two-seat chairlift (lift 2)
1 T-bar lift (lift 6)

Besides, there are several surface lifts for beginners (rope tows and magic carpet).

Bukovel Ski School
Bukovel Ski School was set up in 2001 by the Bukovel Ski Resort and ski and snowboarding coaches. It trains people of all ages, as well as provides training grounds for professional sportsmen. The School promotes skiing and health programmes.
During each season the Bukovel Ski Schools organizes over 30 ski and snowboarding events for children, amateurs, professional sportsmen and coaches. In the summertime the School holds a children's health and sports camp programmes and other leisure events for Bukovel's visitors.

The Bukovel Ski School co-sponsors several large-scale charity social projects among children, junior sportsmen and students of boarding schools to promote skiing. The School cooperates with the Ukraine's Ministry for Education and Science and Ministry for Youth and Sports, Ski Federation of Ukraine and Ukraine's National Olympic Committee. All coaches have qualified under ISIA, international standards for skiing and snowboarding instructors.

Bukovel Bike Park
Bike Park at the Bukovel Ski Resort has routes for various mountain biking disciplines (MTB):
 Cross-Country
 DownHill

The bike routes run for 46.7 km with 4.7 km for speed downhill biking. The Bike Park has 10 routes of various difficulty and length, from general tours to DownHill and SuperD.

Over 6,000 visitors came to the Park each season.

The Bukovel Bike Park organizes and hosts a number of biking events yearly, including the Bukovel Grand Bike Fest, Ukraine's National DownHill Championship and Bukovel DH.

Bukovel Sport Weekends
In 2016, Bukovel held 4 sport events: Bukovel Sprint Triathlon Cup, Bukovel Mountain UltraSwim, Bukovel Triathlon Olympic Cup and Bukovel Endurance UltraTrail. The Sport Weekends concept became popular among Ukrainian sportsmen – they chose the hardest distances and the highest mountain competitions.
Bukovel aims to become a sports capital of Ukraine. To attain this objective the resort has increased the number of competitions and distance options.
Under the "Train and Compete in Bukovel" slogan in 2017 Bukovel Sport Weekends are to consist of:
 20/05 – Bukovel Cycling Race
 27/05 – Bukovel Sprint Triathlon Cup
 11-13/08 – Bukovel 160 km UltraTrail
 2/09 – Bukovel Mountain UltraSwim
 9/09 – Bukovel Olympic Triathlon Cup
 16-17 – Bukovel Endurance 55 km Trail
 30/09 – Bukovel 1/2 Iron Triathlon

Winter Olympic ambitions
The additional land will be used for the construction of several new ski lifts and service projects. Previously, the land was a government-managed forest preserve area. Bukovel has also plans to build an Olympic winter stadium in preparation for a possible bid. In 2008, the head of the Ukrainian NOC (National Olympic Committee), Serhiy Bubka, announced that even though Bukovel is a world-class ski-resort the talks of hosting the Olympic games are ridiculous as the town does not have the required infrastructure to host such a big event. The deadline for the Olympic bid was October 15, 2009, for which Bukovel was not prepared.

In 2019 the Bukovel ski resort had 60 kilometers of slopes, they required compensating for low snowfall by producing artificial snow because the highest point is only 1300 meters above sea level. Bukovel, however, has too little water to produce enough artificial snow.

In the early months of 2010, the administration of Bukovel was involved in the government scandal around the dismissal of the director of the Gorgany Natural Preserve. Vasyl Kisliak was fired by the Minister for protection of the natural environment Filipchuk "for a low level of organizational skills" as the administration of Bukovel could not find a middle ground and cooperation with the director. The cornerstone of the argument became an infrastructural development of the resort and particularly a road that would connect Bukovel with Yaremche.

In 2014, Ukraine dropped its 2022 Olympic bid due to the War in Donbass. Officials said they would focus on bidding for the 2026 Winter Games.

In 2021 some 55 environmental groups demanded that the International Olympic Committee (IOC) not to consider Ukraine as a venue for Winter Games. The criticism is that the Ukrainian government under President Zelenskyy is using an Olympic bid as a pretext to be able to implement several controversial construction projects in the Carpathians. The Carpathians are one of the largest forest regions in Europe and include the last Ancient and Primeval Beech Forests of Europe. The ecosystem could be thrown out of balance by the construction projects.

Gallery

References

External links
 
 
 

Ski areas and resorts in Ukraine
Eastern Carpathians
Geography of Ivano-Frankivsk Oblast